Sean Bryan Shanahan (February 8, 1951 – May 15, 2022) was a Canadian professional ice hockey left winger.

Biography
Shanahan was drafted by the Houston Aeros in the ninth round, 110th overall, of the 1973 WHA Amateur Draft. He caused some controversy in Boston by being the first person after Hockey Hall of Fame player Phil Esposito to wear #7. He also played four games in the World Hockey Association with the Cincinnati Stingers.

Shanahan died on May 15, 2022, at the age of 71.

Career statistics
Regular season and playoffs

References

External links
 

1951 births
2022 deaths
Boston Bruins players
Canadian ice hockey left wingers
Cincinnati Stingers players
Colorado Rockies (NHL) players
Dallas Black Hawks players
Houston Aeros draft picks
Kitchener Rangers players
Montreal Canadiens players
Nova Scotia Voyageurs players
Oshawa Generals players
Providence Friars men's ice hockey players
Rhode Island Reds players
Rochester Americans players
Ice hockey people from Toronto
Toronto Marlboros players
Undrafted National Hockey League players